Azara may refer to:

Places
 Azara, Huesca, Spain
 Azara, Misiones, Argentina
 Azara, Guwahati, Assam, India
 Azara railway station
 Dorsum Azara, a ridge on the moon

People
 Antonio Azara (1883–1967), Italian jurist and politician
 Félix de Azara (1746–1821), a naturalist, brother of José
 José Nicolás de Azara (1730–1804), a Spanish diplomat
 Jo-El Azara, the pen name of Joseph Loeckx (born 1937), a Belgian comic writer and artist
 Nancy Azara (born 1939), an American sculptor

Other uses
 Azara (plant), a genus of plants in the family Salicaceae
 Azara, an opera by John Knowles Paine
 El Azara (Arabic: العزارة), 3–13 February in the Berber calendar

See also

Azarah, an early Assyrian king
Azra (disambiguation)
 Asara (disambiguation)